Vladi Vargas (born 11 August 1971) is a music producer and sound engineer in Västerås, Sweden. Starting out as a Dj, he was one of the pioneers in the Hip Hop culture in Sweden. During the 1980s he participated in several national DJ competitions and rap battles. Later in the 1990s, Vladi Vargas began to produce music and worked more in recording studios.

Today, Vladi Vargas is linked to Soundism where he has been involved in a long list of Hip Hop and Reggae music productions. As a sound engineer, his mixing or mastering includes e.g.: 
Promoe's "White Man's Burden" and "Long Distance Runner" hip hop albums.
Junior Kelly's "Rasta Should Be Deeper" reggae hit song.
Embee featuring José Gonsalez "Send Someone Away" hip hop ethno cross over single.
Måns Zelmerlöw "The Prayer" pop song.

References

External links
 
 Vladi Vargas on Soundism's official page

Swedish audio engineers
Hip hop record producers
Living people
People from Västerås
1971 births